NASM–MR or Naval Anti-Ship Missile–Medium Range is a anti-ship missile being developed by the Defence Research and Development Organisation for the Indian Navy. It is the second indigenous anti-ship cruise missile developed for the Indian Navy.
DRDO has been given permission to develop an indigenously developed anti-ship missile known as the Naval Anti-ship Missile-Medium range, which is a significant step toward self- reliance in niche missile technology and reaffirms the Indian Navy's commitment to indigenisation (NASM-MR).

NASM-MR, a Harpoon class anti-ship missile, will have a longer range and will initially be developed as an air launched all-weather, over-the-horizon anti-ship missile for fixed-wing fighter jets and Maritime Patrol Aircraft, but three other variants are also being considered.

NASM-MR, with the addition of a solid-fuel rocket booster, will be developed for launch from frontline warships, providing significantly greater range than the air-launched variant. NASM-MR, with the addition of a solid-fuel rocket booster, will be able to hit targets up to 350 km far, will be Canisterised, and will be designed for attacking small- to medium-sized warships such as frigates, corvettes, and destroyers.

The third variant will be the NASM-MR, which will include a solid-fuel rocket booster housed inside a watertight launched capsule that can be fired from the submarine's torpedo tubes. However, the range of the submarine-launched anti-ship missile may be 100 kilometres less than that of the ship- based variant.

NASM-MR based Coastal defence batteries for the Indian Navy are also available, but it may take longer than the other three variants due to Indian Navy requirements. Coastal defence batteries based on NASM-MR, while unlikely to become a reality, will have significant export potential because many countries may be interested in such a weapon system.

References 

Anti-ship cruise missiles of India